The California Street Cable Railroad (Cal Cable) was a long-serving cable car operator in San Francisco, founded by Leland Stanford. The company's first line opened on California Street in 1878 and is the oldest cable car line still in operation.

The company remained independent until 1951, outlasting all the other commercial streetcar and  cable car operators in the city. The city purchased and reopened the lines in 1952; the current cable car system is a hybrid made up of the California Street line, and the Hyde Street section of Cal Cable's O'Farrell, Jones & Hyde line, together with other lines already in municipal ownership.

California type streetcar
California's mild climate encouraged an innovative streetcar design first used on the California Street Cable Railroad in 1891. The cars feature an enclosed center section with open seating on each end of the car. These California type streetcars were subsequently adopted by many California electric railways, including Pacific Electric, Los Angeles Railway and San Francisco, Napa and Calistoga Railway.

See also
San Francisco cable car system

References

External links
Finding Aid to the California Street Cable Railroad Company records, 1884-1952, The Bancroft Library
a scripophily based article re. the San Francisco Cal Cable and the Swiss Borel Bankers (in German)

Cable car railways in the United States
Public transportation in San Francisco
Defunct California railroads
1878 establishments in California